Cirsium grahamii, called Graham's thistle, is a North American species of plants in the tribe Cardueae within the family Asteraceae.  The species is native to Sonora, Chihuahua, Durango, Nuevo León, New Mexico, and Arizona.

Cirsium grahamii is a biennial herb up to 100 cm (40 inches) tall, blooming only once before dying. Leaves have thin spines along the edges. There is several flower heads per plant, with deep purple disc florets but no ray florets.

References

External links
Photo of herbarium specimen collected in Nuevo León

grahamii
Flora of North America
Plants described in 1853